Auguste Monciero (21 August 1908 – 2 June 2001) was a French racing cyclist. He rode in the 1933 Tour de France.

References

1908 births
2001 deaths
French male cyclists
Place of birth missing